The 100 Park Avenue Building, formerly known as the Medical Arts Building, is a high-rise in downtown Oklahoma City. The building is constructed in the Art Deco style and was designed by Solomon Andrew Layton. It opened in 1923, at which point it was the tallest building in Oklahoma City.

Architecture
Art Deco style emphasizes geometric forms: spheres, polygons, rectangles, trapezoids, zigzags, chevrons, and sunburst motifs. Elements are often arranged in symmetrical patterns. Modern materials such as aluminum, stainless steel, Bakelite, chrome, and plastics are used. Colors tend to be vivid and high-contrast.

See also
List of tallest buildings in Oklahoma City

References

Art Deco skyscrapers
Art Deco architecture in Oklahoma
Office buildings completed in 1923
Skyscraper office buildings in Oklahoma City